Cremohipparion is an extinct genus of horse living in Eurasia and Africa during the Miocene through Pliocene.

Its habitat or biome consisted of non-forested, grassy plains, shortgrass prairie or steppes.

Taxonomy
Cremohipparion was originally coined as a subgenus of Hipparion for a number of Eurasian species. Later, Bernor and Tobien (1989) elevated Cremohipparion to full generic status in their description of small hipparionin specimens from Samos, Greece.

References

Prehistoric mammals of Asia
Miocene horses
Pliocene horses
Miocene genus first appearances
Prehistoric mammals of Europe
Prehistoric placental genera